The 2015 European Darts Open was the sixth of nine PDC European Tour events on the 2015 PDC Pro Tour. The tournament took place at the Maritim Hotel in Düsseldorf, Germany between 10 and 12 July 2015. It featured a field of 48 players and £115,000 in prize money, with £25,000 going to the winner.

Robert Thornton won his first European title after beating Kim Huybrechts 6–2 in the final.

Prize money
The prize fund was increased to £115,000 after being £100,000 for the previous two years.

Qualification and format
The top 16 players from the PDC ProTour Order of Merit on 9 May 2015 automatically qualified for the event. The remaining 32 places went to players from three qualifying events - 20 from the UK Qualifier (held in Crawley on 15 May), eight from the European Qualifier (held in Düsseldorf on 9 July) and four from the Host Nation Qualifier (held at the venue the day before the event started). The number four seed Gary Anderson and Keegan Brown withdrew before the day before the event started due to illness. The following players took part in the tournament:

Top 16
  Michael van Gerwen (semi-finals)
  James Wade (semi-finals)
  Peter Wright (second round)
  Michael Smith (third round)
  Brendan Dolan (quarter-finals)
  Simon Whitlock (third round)
  Vincent van der Voort (quarter-finals)
  Ian White (second round)
  Mervyn King (third round)
  Justin Pipe (third round)
  Robert Thornton (winner)
  Terry Jenkins (third round)
  Kim Huybrechts (runner-up)
  Dave Chisnall (second round)
  Steve Beaton (second round)
  Benito van de Pas (second round)

UK Qualifier 
  Mark Walsh (second round)
  Stephen Bunting (first round)
  Gerwyn Price (first round)
  John Henderson (second round)
  Eddie Dootson (first round)
  Andrew Gilding (first round)
  Barrie Bates (first round)
  Jamie Lewis (second round)
  Andy Smith (first round)
  Mark Webster (third round)
  Johnny Haines (third round)
  Alan Norris (quarter-finals)
  Wes Newton (second round)
  Joe Cullen (second round)
  Daryl Gurney (first round)
  Devon Petersen (third round)
  Kevin McDine (second round)
  Stuart Kellett (first round)
  Nathan Aspinall (first round)

European Qualifier
  Rowby-John Rodriguez (second round)
  Mensur Suljović (second round)
  Dimitri Van den Bergh (second round)
  Jelle Klaasen (quarter-finals)
  Christian Kist (first round)
  Leo Hendriks (first round)
  Dirk van Duijvenbode (second round)
  Mike De Decker (first round)

Host Nation Qualifier
  Michael Rosenauer (first round)
  Jyhan Artut (second round)
  Tomas Seyler (first round)
  Christian Soethe (first round)
  Maik Langendorf (first round)

Draw

References

2015 PDC European Tour
2015 in German sport